Heat is an English entertainment magazine published by Bauer Media Group. Its mix of celebrity news, gossip, beauty advice and fashion is primarily aimed at women, although not as directly as in other women's magazines. It also features movie and music reviews, TV listings and major celebrity interviews.

History
Heat was launched in February 1999 as a general interest entertainment magazine, at a cost of more than £4m. However, unlike other Emap (now Bauer) magazine launches before and after, it was not an immediate success, with a circulation below 100,000. A series of revamps quickly repositioned the magazine as a less serious, more gossip-oriented magazine aimed at women, and circulation quickly grew. A series of high-profile celebrity relationships, such as Jennifer Aniston and Brad Pitt provided ample material, while reality shows such as Big Brother and Pop Idol grew popular at just the right time to help fill pages. Heat achieved record sale figures when Jade Goody had a make-over and was first on the front cover after her stint in Big Brother 3 (2002) and later when Nikki Grahame and Pete Bennett from Big Brother 7 split and Grahame was interviewed for  Heat in 2006.

In 2009–10, Heat spearheaded a campaign alongside Girls Aloud's Nicola Roberts advocating the banning of sunbed use in the UK for under-18s. The campaign was a success and a bill was passed by Parliament shortly before the 2010 General Election.

The site crashed after the magazine was mentioned on Channel 4's The Million Pound Drop; it took up to eight days to restore the site.

Editors
 Barry McIlheney (1999–2000)
 Mark Frith (2000–08)
 Julian Linley (2008–09)
 Sam Delaney (2009–2010)
 Lucie Cave (2011–2012); Editor-in-Chief across the heat brand (2012-)
 Jeremy Mark (2012–15)
 Suzy Cox (2015-)

An edition of the magazine is also published in South Africa.

Heatworld.com

Heatworld.com launched on 22 May 2007 and was edited by Julian Linley, who had been deputy editor of Heat magazine for five years. The site is an online interpretation of the magazine, emulating the mix of celebrity news, gossip and fashion. However, heatworld.com does not replicate magazine content and bases itself more on video and audio content and breaking news. The site is advertising funded.

Heat Radio
On 25 September 2007, Heat Radio launched. The station is owned by Bauer Radio, a division of the company, Bauer, which owns Heat magazine. The station can be listened to through Freeview on channel number 716, across the UK on DAB Digital Radio, on their app or at heatradio.com.

Television channel
On 3 July 2012, Heat launched, featuring celebrity news and music. The channel comes from Box Television, a joint venture between Bauer and Channel Four. It replaced Q on Sky, Smallworld Cable and Virgin Media in the UK, in Ireland on Sky and UPC Ireland and in Iceland on Síminn.

In May 2016, the channel was rebranded as Box Upfront.

Heat merchandise
As Heat magazine grew in popularity, spin off merchandise was released to cash in on its success. Current items carrying the Heat brand name are an exercise DVD titled Heat: Get That Celeb Look which was released in 2003, an interactive DVD game featuring celebrity questions, an annual for the year 2007 and in 2003 a set of mini books titled Say What were released containing quotes from celebrities such as Gareth Gates.

Controversy
In an issue which was released on 27 November 2007, Heat used a photograph of Katie Price's disabled son, who suffers from septo-optic dysplasia, a rare condition which means he is visually impaired and suffers from hormonal deficiencies, causing him to easily gain weight and means he is partially blind, on a sticker which was included with the magazine, with the slogan "Harvey wants to eat me!" The magazine's editor Mark Frith made an apology for the offence caused by the sticker, and an apology was also posted on the magazine's website. A spokesperson for the Press Complaints Commission confirmed that Katie Price was planning to make a complaint about the matter. The magazine was also criticized in the press over the incident, with one editorial describing it as "the lowest point in British journalism".

In another issue released on 6–12 September 2014, Heat published a photograph of Justin Timberlake, husband to Jessica Biel, at a nightclub in Paris on the night after his performance. The star was photographed partying with women at the club as the title named it "Justin Timberlake gets flirty with another woman - That's not his wife!". Once the article, as well as the pictures surfaced it caused his marriage with Jessica to be manipulated. The singer and actor lodged a defamation claim in the courts in Ireland against the publishers of the celebrity title over an article, photographs and quotes attributed to Biel. In the agreed statement read in the high court, a lawyer for the Heat publisher Bauer group admitted the article headlined "The flirty photos that rocked Justin and Jessica’s marriage" was based on an unfounded report. The article also included purported statements improperly attributed to Biel which the publishers said Heat now understands the actor never made. The Bauer media group later apologized on Heat magazine's behalf over these allegations, and a settlement was made in a hearing before the president of the High Court, Mr Justice Nicholas Kearns.

Heat's Twitter Awards
Heat launched heat's Twitter Awards in 2013 that it says will celebrate “the joyful collision of celebrities and social media”. Heat promoted its celebrity Twitter awards via Heat's TV, radio, magazine and social media platforms as well as a marketing campaign, which will include press, radio, digital, PR and retail activity.

Specially created videos for each category were released as the campaign progressed and designed to bring each category to life. The winners will announced via Heatworld.com and also its YouTube Channel.

Heat's Weird crush poll
Every year since 2006 (except for 2012), Heat opens a poll to find the nation's oddest celebrity crush. The winners of each year are:

 2006: Richard Hammond (Top Gear co-host)
 2007: James May (Top Gear co-host)
 2008: Jeremy Clarkson (Top Gear co-host)
 2009: Derren Brown (mind magician)
 2010: Karl Pilkington (An Idiot Abroad star)
 2011: Richard Osman (Pointless co-host)
 2013: Russell Howard (comedian)
 2014: Matt Richardson (comedian)
 2015: Jake Wood (EastEnders actor)
 2016: Jake Wood
 2017: Jake Wood
 2018: Jake Wood
 2019: Piers Morgan (journalist and television personality)
 2020: Piers Morgan
 2021: Perri Kiely (radio presenter for KISS Breakfast)

Heat's Unmissables Awards 
Heat annually crowns the greatest achievements in pop culture, from films and TV to books and podcasts in its annual Unmissables Awards. The readers vote in the key category of Best TV Soap.

Categories 

 TV Comedy of the Year
 TV Drama of the Year
 Actor of the Year
 Actress of the Year
 TV & Radio Presenter of the Year
 Reality TV Show of the Year
 TV Entertainment Show of the Year
 Book of the Year
 Soap of the Year
 Comedian of the Year
 Podcast of the Year
 TV Binge of the Year
 TV Moment of the Year
 Film of the Year
 Album of the Year

References

External links
 

1999 establishments in the United Kingdom
Bauer Group (UK)
Celebrity magazines published in the United Kingdom
Entertainment magazines published in the United Kingdom
Magazines published in London
Magazines established in 1999
Weekly magazines published in the United Kingdom